Domrud-e Amir-e Sofla (also Romanized as Domrūd-e Amīr-e Soflá) is a village in Afrineh Rural District, Mamulan District, Pol-e Dokhtar County, Lorestan Province, Iran. At the 2006 census, its population was 219, in 43 families.

References 

Towns and villages in Pol-e Dokhtar County